VinBus or VinBus LLC, formally the VinBus Ecology Transport Services LLC, is a Vietnamese privately-operated non-profit bus route network service established by Vingroup in 2019.

History
The VinBus subsidiary was announced by Vingroup on May 2, 2019, with transit service starting in March 2020 and the deployment of 3,000 electric buses planned through the future.

Electric bus

The VinBus-branded low-floor electric city bus is produced by VinFast, Vingroup's automotive subsidiary, at the company's Automobile Manufacture Complex located in Hai Phong. Using the VinBus-designated 150 kWh DC fast-charging stations provided by StarCharge, the battery can be charged within ~2 hours. Batteries used by the VinBus fleet are provided by a joint venture between VinFast and LG Chem, while other components are supplied by Siemens.

Transit service

VinBus currently operates three bus transit networks in the cities of Hanoi, Ho Chi Minh City, and Phú Quốc City.

References

External links
 Official website

Vingroup
VinFast vehicles
2019 establishments in Vietnam
Electric buses
Transport in Vietnam
Transport in Hanoi
Transport in Ho Chi Minh City